Andreas Klöden (born 22 June 1975) is a German former professional road bicycle racer, who competed as a professional between 1998 and 2013. His major achievements include a bronze medal at the 2000 Olympic Games and finishing second in the general classification at the 2004 and 2006 Tour de France. Klöden was a tall, lightly built racer with enough strength to place high in the overall classifications of the Grand Tours, but his performances were affected by injuries.

Biography
Klöden was born in Mittweida in 1975. Before he turned professional, he won the bronze medal in the Under 23 World Time Trial Championships in 1996, and two stages at the International Rheinland-Pfalz Rundfahrt in 1997.

The T-Mobile years (1998–2006)
In 1999, he won a stage at the Portuguese Tour of Algarve. But the first of his great seasons came in 2000, where after notching two important victories in the GC of Paris–Nice and Tour of the Basque Country, he went on to obtain the bronze medal at the 2000 Sydney Olympics, after fellow German Jan Ullrich and Kazakh Alexander Vinokourov, two riders with whom he would spend several seasons on T-Mobile.

After that came three injury plagued seasons in which he gained no victories. He was forced to abandon the 2003 Tour de France due to a fractured tailbone. 2004 saw his cycling rebirth as he won the German National Road Racing Championships and so continued T-Mobile/Team Telekom's winning streak, which went back to Bernd Gröne's 1993 win of these Championships. Klöden held his great moment of form until the Tour de France, which began one week later. In that Tour, which he began as a domestique for Ullrich, he did not win any stage but finished second overall after taking second place from Italian Ivan Basso in the final time trial. Ullrich, whom Klöden was supposed to be supporting, finished fourth that year, the only time he finished outside the top three in the Tour de France.

In the 2005 season he won a stage at the Bayern-Rundfahrt. Klöden as well as teammates Ullrich and Vinokourov were considered among the challengers for the 2005 Tour de France overall victory, with Ullrich as the strongest bid. Klöden contributed to the team success of T-Mobile in the race that saw Ullrich finish 3rd and Vinokourov finish fifth. On stage 8 in the Vosges Mountains, he attacked halfway up the final climb of the day and eventually took the K.O.M. points, catching breakaway leader Pieter Weening right at the summit. On the way down to the finish in Geradmer, he lost the sprint finish in the closest Tour de France finish of all time – (9.6 millimetres or 0.0002 secs) until stage 7 of the 2017 Tour de France when Marcel Kittel beat Edvald Boasson Hagen ( 4.0 millimetres or 0.00003 secs). Later, he withdrew from the Tour at stage 17 into Revel, having crashed during the 16th stage and fracturing a bone in his right wrist.

In the Tour of 2006, Klöden became one of the favorites for the overall victory when Ullrich, Vinokourov and Basso did not start. Vinokourov did not participate because of his teammates doping scandal, which caused his Astana team to fall below the minimum six riders to start. After somewhat weak performances in the first mountain stages, Klöden was in good shape in the Alps, climbing in the overall ranking. Klöden was very strong in the closing time trial where he finished second after his teammate Serhiy Honchar, climbing from fourth to the third place in the general classification over Carlos Sastre. On stage 11 to the Pla D'Beret, Klöden was dropped by the leading group and lost about 1:30mins, which cost him dearly. On Stage 15, he performed strongly, dropping everyone, except eventual overall winner Floyd Landis. On Stage 16, Kloden again performed well, finishing fourth on the stage, however on stage 17, he again cracked on the Col de Joux Plane, but recovered on the descent, thanks mainly to the help given to him by teammate Patrik Sinkewitz.

The Astana years (2007–2009)
This announcement came as something of a surprise to the cycling community because Klöden, despite his talent and accomplishments, would almost certainly not be the leader of that team, which was organized around Vinokourov. During the Tour de France, he rode well, but had to help Astana captain Vinokourov, and lost a few minutes. An accident almost saw the repeat of his 2003 Tour injury, but this time the injury to the coccyx was just a hairline fracture and he was able to continue. Astana formally withdrew from the 2007 Tour de France on 24 July, when Vinokourov's doping test was found to be positive.

His racing in September was interrupted by injury, following an accident while out training when a car crossed his path forcing him to swerve, Klöden ended up in a ditch. Although an X-ray showed no broken bones, he missed the GP de Plouay and the Tour of Poland.

His 2008 season was uneventful in grand tours though he won the Tour of Romandie that year and he came second in the Tour de Suisse. His 2009 Tour de France was mainly serving as a domestique for Alberto Contador and Lance Armstrong though after stage 15 Kloden sat 4th overall. Klodens podium chances closed in however on stage 17 when his teammate Alberto Contador put in a controversial attack dropping Kloden allowing the Andy and Frank Schleck to gain over 2 minutes over him. He would later end up finishing 6th overall that year though he would end up moving into 5th overall after Lance Armstrong's titles were stripped.

On 2 October 2009 it was confirmed that Klöden would join  for the 2010 season

2009 Doping allegations
In 2009 allegations emerged claiming that Andreas Klöden used the Freiburg University Clinic for an illegal blood transfusion during the 2006 Tour de France. Later, Kloden and others apart of the T-Mobile Team, Matthias Kessler and Patrick Sinkewitz were confirmed by Freiberg doctors to have blood doped at the University during the 2006 Tour de France where their blood was held.
At his retirement, Klöden denied that he ever used doping. He had made an agreement with prosecutors paid an undisclosed amount to a charity, to stop the investigation, because he felt that the investigation hindered his career.

The Team Radioshack Years (2010–2011)
Klöden had an uneventful 2010 season. He finished the 2010 Tour de France in 14th place 16’36” behind Contador. Contador was later disqualified, resulting in a 13th place 15'57' behind Andy Schleck. His other biggest finishes were 8th in Tour de Suisse and Eneco Tour.

2011 saw a rebirth of Klöden's career when he won the 2011 Tour of the Basque Country while also finished 2nd in Paris–Nice and getting a stage victory. He also had 2 ITT victories in Giro del Trentino and Critérium International. He carried his good form into the 2011 Tour de France but crashed and had to withdraw because of two crashes that injured his back. He later entered the Vuelta as co-leader with Brajkovic but withdrew.

RadioShack-Nissan (2012–2013)
In 2012, Klöden signed with RadioShack-NissanTrek. He finished the 2012 Tour de France in 11th place, 17'54" behind Wiggins. He also finished 4th in the USA Pro Cycling Challenge.

Klöden continued to ride for Radioshack in 2013. He finished 9th in both the 2013 Volta ao Algarve and 2013 Paris-Nice early on in the season. His first top five finish came in the 2013 Tour of Belgium, where he finished fourth. He lost time early on in the Pyrenees in the 2013 Tour de France, forcing him to switch his goals from the general classification to stage wins. He made the breakaway on stage 16 to Gap, finishing in fifth place. He tried his luck again on stage 19 to Le Grand-Bornand. After finishing second there in the 2004 Tour de France behind Lance Armstrong; he finished second again, this time after Rui Costa who had also won the stage to Gap. He finished the Tour in 30th place, 1h02'43" behind winner Chris Froome.

In October 2013, Klöden announced his retirement from cycling after a sixteen-year professional career.

Career achievements

Major results

1996
 3rd  Time trial, UCI Road World Under–23 Championships
1997
 1st Prologue & Stage 7b Rheinland-Pfalz Rundfahrt
 1st Stage 3 Flèche du Sud
 1st Stage 4 Commonwealth Bank Classic
 7th Time trial, UCI Road World Under–23 Championships
 7th HEW Cyclassics
 9th Overall Circuit Cycliste Sarthe
1998
 1st  Overall Niedersachsen Rundfahrt
1st Stage 3a
 1st Prologue Tour de Normandie
1999
 1st Stage 3 Volta ao Algarve
 5th Overall Regio-Tour
2000
 1st  Overall Tour of the Basque Country
1st Stage 5b
 1st  Overall Paris–Nice
1st Stage 7
 1st Stage 7 Peace Race
 2nd Overall Deutschland Tour
 2nd Overall Danmark Rundt
 3rd  Road race, Olympic Games
 3rd Overall Regio-Tour
 5th EnBW GP
 5th Overall Setmana Catalana
2001
 5th EnBW GP
 8th Grand Prix Eddy Merckx
2002
 2nd Overall Regio-Tour
 5th Overall Sachsen Tour
2003
 4th Overall Critérium International
 7th Overall Tirreno–Adriatico
2004
 1st  Road race, National Road Championships
 2nd Overall Tour de France
 2nd Overall Bayern Rundfahrt
 6th La Flèche Wallonne
 6th Overall Deutschland Tour
2005
 1st Stage 5 Bayern Rundfahrt
2006
 1st  Overall Regio-Tour
1st Stage 4
 2nd Overall Tour de France
2007
 1st  Overall Tirreno–Adriatico
 1st  Overall Circuit Cycliste Sarthe
1st Stage 2
 5th Overall Critérium International
 5th Overall Bayern Rundfahrt
 10th Overall Tour de Suisse
2008
 1st  Overall Tour de Romandie
1st Stage 3
 2nd Overall Tour de Suisse
 8th Overall Volta ao Algarve
2009
 1st Stage 1 (ITT) Giro del Trentino
 2nd Overall Tour de Luxembourg
 3rd Overall Tirreno–Adriatico
1st Stage 5
 4th Overall Tour de Suisse
 5th Overall Tour de France
1st Stage 4 (TTT)
 5th Overall Volta ao Algarve
2010
 4th Overall Vuelta a Murcia
 8th Overall Tour de Suisse
 8th Overall Eneco Tour
 8th Overall Volta ao Algarve
 8th Overall Tour de Luxembourg
2011
 1st  Overall Tour of the Basque Country
1st  Points classification
 1st Stage 3 (ITT) Critérium International
 1st Stage 1 (ITT) Giro del Trentino
 2nd Overall Paris–Nice
1st Stage 5
 5th Overall Volta ao Algarve
2012
 4th Overall USA Pro Cycling Challenge
2013
 4th Overall Tour of Belgium
 9th Overall Volta ao Algarve
 9th Overall Paris–Nice

General classification results timeline

References

External links 

 
 Andreas Klöden on the Homepage of his Team Radioshack

1975 births
Living people
People from Mittweida
People from Bezirk Karl-Marx-Stadt
German male cyclists
Cyclists from Saxony
Doping cases in cycling
Olympic cyclists of Germany
Cyclists at the 2000 Summer Olympics
Cyclists at the 2004 Summer Olympics
German cycling road race champions
Olympic bronze medalists for Germany
Olympic medalists in cycling
Medalists at the 2000 Summer Olympics
21st-century German people